Nicole Devonish (born 24 August 1973) is a Canadian athlete. She competed in the women's long jump at the 1996 Summer Olympics.

References

External links
 

1973 births
Living people
Athletes (track and field) at the 1996 Summer Olympics
Canadian female long jumpers
Olympic track and field athletes of Canada
Athletes (track and field) at the 1994 Commonwealth Games
Commonwealth Games competitors for Canada
Athletes from Toronto
Black Canadian female track and field athletes